Dominic James Samuel (born 1 April 1994) is an English professional footballer, who currently plays as a striker for Ross County.

Club career
As part of the Reading Academy, Samuel enjoyed a prolific start to the 2011–12 season, scoring 13 goals in 14 games for the under-18 side. As a result, he was rewarded with his first professional contract on 17 December 2011. He made his debut for Reading coming on as a 72nd-minute substitute, for Garath McCleary, in Reading's 3–0 defeat away to Sunderland on 11 December 2012.

On 3 January 2013 Samuel joined League One side Colchester United on a one-month youth loan deal. After making two appearances, he returned to Reading on 31 January. On 9 January 2014, Samuel joined teammate Lawson D'Ath at Dagenham & Redbridge on a one-month youth loan. He made his debut three days later against Fleetwood Town though he was forced off during the first half with a knee injury. Reading later confirmed that his loan had been cut short as the damage needed to be repaired surgically.

On 29 January 2015, Samuel joined Coventry City on loan till 28 April 2015, scoring on his debut against Rochdale.

On 13 November 2015, Samuel joined League One side Gillingham on an emergency loan deal until 10 December. On 9 December, Samuel had his loan spell with Gillingham extended until 2 January 2016.

On 5 January 2016, Gillingham announced that Samuel had extended his stay at Priestfield for another three weeks.

Samuel scored his first goal for Reading against Burton Albion on 19 November 2016.

On 31 January 2017, Samuel joined Ipswich Town on loan for the remainder of the 2016–17 season.

Blackburn Rovers
On 18 July 2017, Samuel signed a three-year deal with Blackburn Rovers for an undisclosed fee. He started his Rovers career brightly with four goals in his first six appearances, but a major anterior cruciate ligament injury later stifled his development.

On 24 June 2020 it was announced that he had signed a short contract extension to allow him to remain with the club until the end of the 2019–20 season after its resumption following the Coronavirus outbreak, but he was then released at the end of the season.

Gillingham 
On 21 September 2020 Samuel re-joined Gillingham on a permanent basis. He scored two goals on his second debut for the Kent side on 26 September 2020, leading the Gills to a 2-0 league victory over Blackpool.

Ross County 
On 29 June 2021 Samuel joined Scottish Premiership side Ross County on a two-year deal.

International career
Samuel made his debut England under-19 against Portugal on 7 October 2011. Samuel scored his first goal for the under-19s in his next match for them, against Ukraine, in a 3–1 victory on 9 October 2011.

Career statistics

Honours
Blackburn Rovers
EFL League One runner-up: 2017–18

References

External links
Dominic Samuel profile at Reading F.C.
Dominic Samuel profile at the FA

1994 births
Living people
Footballers from Southwark
English footballers
England youth international footballers
Association football forwards
Reading F.C. players
Colchester United F.C. players
Dagenham & Redbridge F.C. players
Coventry City F.C. players
Gillingham F.C. players
Ipswich Town F.C. players
Blackburn Rovers F.C. players
Premier League players
English Football League players
Black British sportsmen
Ross County F.C. players
Scottish Professional Football League players